Christian leaders have written about male homosexual activities since the first decades of Christianity; female homosexual behaviour was almost entirely ignored. Throughout the majority of Christian history, most Christian theologians and denominations have considered homosexual behavior as immoral or sinful.

However, since the second half of 20th century some prominent Christian theologians and religious groups have espoused a wide variety of beliefs and practices towards homosexuals, including the establishment of various "open and accepting" Christian churches and denominations that actively support LGBT members.

Etymology 
The first instance of the English word "homosexuals" used in a biblical translation was in the RSV New Testament published from 1946 until 1970, which simultaneously removed most "fornication" admonitions found in the prior ASV (1901) and KJV (1611) Bibles. Historically, the Vulgate contains the Latin stem "fornicat" within 92 verses representing sixteen centuries of Christian tradition on literally wording sexual admonishments, while verses now rebuking homosexuals were described in the Vulgate equivalent to "male-prostitute male-concubines". RSV set a modern trend in literally rebuking "homosexuals".

Several post-World War II translations of the Bible now have one to four verses literally rebuking homosexuals while replacing all mention of fornicators with "the immoral" or "sexual immoral" and leaving ambiguous homosexual or heterosexual immorality.

Early Christianity 

The history of Christianity and homosexuality has been much debated. The Hebrew Bible and its traditional interpretations in Judaism and Christianity have historically affirmed and endorsed a patriarchal and heteronormative approach towards human sexuality, favouring exclusively penetrative vaginal intercourse between men and women within the boundaries of marriage over all other forms of human sexual activity, including autoeroticism, masturbation, oral sex, non-penetrative and non-heterosexual sexual intercourse (all of which have been labeled as "sodomy" at various times), believing and teaching that such behaviors are forbidden because they are considered sinful, and further compared to or derived from the behavior of the alleged residents of Sodom and Gomorrah. However, the status of LGBT people in early Christianity is debated. Some maintain that the early Christian churches deplored transgender people and same-sex relationships, while others maintain that they accepted them on the level of their heterosexual counterparts. These disagreements concern, in some cases, the translations of certain terms, or the meaning and context of some biblical passages.

Prior to the rise of Christianity, certain sexual practices that are today considered "homosexual" had existed among certain groups, with some degree of social acceptance in ancient Rome and ancient Greece (e.g. the pederastic relationship of an adult Greek male with a Greek youth, or of a Roman citizen with a slave). Both societies viewed anal sex as an act of dominance by the active (penetrating) partner over the passive (penetrated) partner, representing no distinction from how vaginal sex was viewed. It was considered a sign of weakness and low social status (such as slavery or infamia) for a man to assume the passive role. There was no such stigma against a man who assumed the active role. Derrick Sherwin Bailey and Sarah Ruden both caution that it is anachronistic to project modern understandings of homosexuality onto ancient writings.

The Judaic prohibitions found in Leviticus 18:22 and 20:13 address the issue of sex between two men. The latter verse (20:13) says: "And if a man also lies with mankind, as with womankind, both of them have committed abomination; they shall surely be put to death; their blood shall be upon them."

In his fourth homily on Romans, John Chrysostom argued in the fourth century that homosexual acts are worse than murder and so degrading that they constitute a kind of punishment in itself, and that enjoyment of such acts actually makes them worse, "for suppose I were to see a person running naked, with his body all besmeared with mire, and yet not covering himself, but exulting in it, I should not rejoice with him, but should rather bewail that he did not even perceive that he was doing shamefully." He also said: "But nothing can there be more worthless than a man who has pandered himself. For not the soul only, but the body also of one who hath been so treated, is disgraced, and deserves to be driven out everywhere."

The writings of the early church contain strong condemnations of same-sex acts. Tertullian wrote, "When Paul asserts that males and females changed among themselves the natural use of the creature in that which is unnatural, he validates the natural way". Ambrosiaster wrote, "Paul tells us that these things came about, that a woman should lust after another woman, because God was angry at the human race because of its idolatry. Those who interpret this differently do not understand the force of the argument. For what is it to change the use of nature into a use which is contrary to nature, if not to take away the former and adopt the latter, so that the same part of the body should be used by each of the sexes in a way for which it was not intended?... It is clear that, because they changed the truth of God into a lie, they changed the natural use (of sexuality) into that use by which they were dishonored and condemned". John Chrysostom wrote, "No one can say that it was by being prevented from legitimate intercourse that they came to this pass or that it was from having no means to fulfill their desire that they were driven to this monstrous insanity... What is contrary to nature has something irritating and displeasing in it, so that they could not even claim to be getting pleasure out of it. For genuine pleasure comes from following what is according to nature. But when God abandons a person to his own devices, then everything is turned upside down." Cyprian wrote, "If you were able... to direct your eyes into secret places, to unfasten the locked doors of sleeping chambers and to open these hidden recesses to the perception of sight, you would behold that being carried on by the unchaste which a chaste countenance could not behold. You would see that it is in an indignity even to see... Men with frenzied lusts rush against men. Things are done which cannot even give pleasure to those who do them".

John Boswell, in his book published in 1994, contends that adelphopoiesis, a Christian rite for uniting two persons of the same sex as "spiritual brothers/sisters", amounted to an approved outlet for romantic and indeed sexual love between couples of the same sex. Boswell also drew attention to Saints Sergius and Bacchus, whose icon depicts the two standing together with Jesus between or behind them, a position he identifies with a pronubus or "best man".  Critics of Boswell's views have argued that the union created was more like blood brotherhood; and that this icon is a typical example of an icon depicting two saints who were martyred together, with the usual image of Christ that appears on many religious icons, and therefore that there is no indication that it depicts a "wedding". But Sergius and Bacchus were both referred to as erastai in ancient Greek manuscripts, the same word used to describe lovers (Boswell).

In her 2010 book Paul Among the People, Sarah Ruden rejects Boswell's interpretation but also argues that Paul the Apostle's writings on homosexuality (such as Romans 1: 26–27) cannot be interpreted as a condemnation of homosexuality as it is understood in modern times. Writing about the context of Greco-Roman culture, she writes: "There were no gay households; there were in fact no gay institutions or gay culture at all." Citing how the society viewed the active and passive roles separately and viewed sex as an act of domination, she concludes that Paul was opposing sexual relations that were, at best, unequal. At worst, they were tantamount by modern standards to male rape and child sexual abuse.

The 16th Canon of the Council of Ancyra (AD 314) prescribed a penance of at least twenty years' duration for those "who have done the irrational" (alogeuesthai).  At the time this was written, it referred to bestiality, not homosexuality.  However, later Latin translations translated it to include both.

In the year AD 342, the Christian emperors Constantius II and Constans decreed the death penalty for any male who "marries [a man] as a woman... [a situation in which] gender has lost its place". In the year AD 390, the Christian emperors Valentinian II, Theodosius I and Arcadius denounced males "acting the part of a woman", condemning those who were guilty of such acts to be publicly burned.

The Middle Ages

John Boswell, in his essay The Church and the Homosexual, attributes Christianity's denunciations of "homosexuality" to an alleged rising intolerance in Europe throughout the 12th century, which he claims was also reflected in other ways.  His premise is that when sodomy was not being explicitly and "officially" denounced, it was therefore being "tolerated".  Historian R. W. Southern disagreed with Boswell's claims and wrote in 1990 that "the only relevant generalization which emerges from the penitential codes down to the eleventh century is that sodomy was treated on about the same level as copulation with animals."  Southern further notes that "Boswell thinks that the omission of sodomy from the stringent new code of clerical celibacy issued by the Roman Council of 1059 implies a degree of tolerance.  Countering this is the argument that the Council of 1059 had more urgent business on hand; and in any case, sodomy had been condemned by Leo IX at Rheims in 1049." Similarly, Pierre Payer asserted in 1984 that Boswell's thesis (as outlined in his Christianity, Homosexuality and Social Tolerance) ignores an alleged wealth of condemnations found in the penitential literature prior to the 12th century. More recently, historian Allan Tulchin wrote in 2007 in the Journal of Modern History that, "It is impossible to prove either way and probably also somewhat irrelevant to understanding their way of thinking. They loved each other, and the community accepted that."

Peter Damian wrote the Liber Gomorrhianus, an extended attack on both homosexuality and masturbation. He portrayed homosexuality as a counter-rational force undermining morality, religion, and society itself, and in need of strong suppression lest it spread even and especially among clergy. Damian reports that even Otto III was intimate with many men (sharing the bed and bath).

Hildegard of Bingen reported seeing visions and recorded them in Scivias (short for Scito vias Domini, "Know the Ways of the Lord"). In Book II Vision Six, she quotes God as condemning same-sex intercourse, including lesbianism; "a woman who takes up devilish ways and plays a male role in coupling with another woman is most vile in My sight, and so is she who subjects herself to such a one in this evil deed".
Her younger contemporary Alain de Lille personified the theme of sexual sin in opposition to nature in The Complaint of Nature by having Nature herself denounce sexual immorality and especially homosexuality as rebellion against her direction, terming it confusion between masculine and feminine and between subject and object. The Complaint also includes a striking description of the neglect of womanhood:

In the 13th century, Thomas Aquinas argued that not all things to which a person might be inclined are "natural" in the morally relevant sense; rather, only the inclination to the full and proper expression of the human nature, and inclinations which align with that inclination, are natural. 
Contrary inclinations are perversions of the natural in the sense that they do seek a good, but in a way destructive of good.

This view points from the natural to the Divine, because (following Aristotle) he said all people seek happiness; but according to Aquinas, happiness can only finally be attained through beatific vision. 
Therefore, all sins are also against the natural law. But the natural law of many aspects of life is knowable apart from special revelation by examining the forms and purposes of those aspects. It is in this sense that Aquinas considered homosexuality unnatural, since it involves a kind of partner other than the kind to which the purpose of sexuality points. He considered it comparable to heterosexual sex for pleasure (rather than reproduction).

The tone of the denunciations often indicate a more than theoretical concern.
Archbishop Ralph of Tours had his lover John installed as Bishop of Orléans with agreement of both the King of France and Pope Urban II. In 1395 there was a transvestite homosexual prostitute arrested in London with some records surviving, and the Twelve Conclusions of the Lollards included the denunciation of priestly celibacy as a cause of sodomy.

The Reformation and Counter-Reformation
 
Martin Luther's view of homosexuality is recorded in Plass's What Luther Says:

Diverging opinions in modern era

Historically, Christian churches have regarded homosexual sex as sinful, based on the Catholic understanding of the natural law and traditional interpretations of certain passages in the Bible. This position is today affirmed by groups representing most Christians, including the Catholic Church (1.1 billion members), Orthodox Church (250 million members), and some Protestant denominations, especially most Pentecostal churches, Evangelical churches such as the Southern Baptist Convention (16.3 million members) and the United Methodist Church (12 million members). In November 2022 the LDS Church (nearly 17 million members) came out in support of the U.S. government protecting same-sex marriage. Although these groups of Christian denominational churches regard homosexuality as sin, and not to be embraced, they do declare that it is their duty to love the sinner but hate the sin. They will therefore receive a homosexual person in their congregation not for the purpose of being inclusive of that person's lifestyle but are of the belief that God can change that person's heart and life and take away his homosexual sins like any other sin through the shed blood of Jesus Christ as stated in the New Testament book 1John 1:7. So, because of their belief that homosexuality is a condition of the heart and not that the person is born that way, they believe that homosexuals can be turned straight if they fully turn their heart to Christ. The message towards homosexuals by one large evangelical church located West South-Central region of America are thus, "THE BATTLE CRY has been sounded, the fight has been started, and the stones have been thrown. Indeed, the nation is once again divided, and the war for the soul of America has begun! So, how should a Christian fight? That fight should certainly not be with hate because it is not the sinner whom God hates; rather, it is his sin. It is homosexuality that we are against, not the homosexual."

However, a minority interpret biblical passages differently and argue that homosexuality can be seen as morally acceptable.  This approach has been taken by a number of denominations in North America, notably the United Church of Canada (2.8 million members), the United Church of Christ (1.1 million members), the Moravian Church (825,000 members), the Anglican Episcopal church (1.8 million members), the Anglican Church of Canada (800,000 members), the Liberal Catholic Church, Friends General Conference, the Presbyterian Church (U.S.A.) (1.9 million members), the Evangelical Lutheran Church in America (3.9 million members) and the Evangelical Lutheran Church in Canada. Relatively many denominations had taken this approach in Europe including united, reformed and Lutheran churches: the Evangelical Church in Germany (24.5 million members), Church of Sweden (6.6 million members), Church of Norway, Church of Denmark, Protestant Church of the Netherlands (3.9 million members), Church of Iceland, United Protestant Church in Belgium, United Protestant Church of France, Federation of Swiss Protestant Churches, Methodist Church of Great Britain (330,000 members) and Church of Scotland.

A new denomination, the Metropolitan Community Church (40,000 members), has also come into existence specifically to serve the Christian LGBT community. Smaller LGBT-friendly Christian denominations have also been founded, such as the Ecumenical Catholic Church and several independent Catholic Churches.

Individual Christians maintain a variety of beliefs on this subject that may or may not correspond to their official church doctrines. Some mainline Protestant denominations in the United States have also removed language in their bylaws which suggest that homosexuality is a sinful state of being. The Book of Order used by the PCUSA reflects this change. Similar modifications in position can also be seen in the Lutheran ELCA and Disciples of Christ. Although acceptance of sexually active LGBT laity has increased in terms of actual practice and in terms of church law, some of these denominations continue to limit leadership and clergy roles for LGBT persons. A number of denominations, like the aforementioned United Methodists, remain divided over the issues relating to homosexuality, with a large number of members pushing for changes in the church's Book of Discipline to allow for full inclusion of LGBT persons in the life of the church.

In 1989, The Evangelical Network was formed with LGBT Evangelical Christians. It is a network of churches, ministries and Christian workers.

See also

 Gay bishops
 LGBT-affirming religious groups
 Queer theology
 Unitarian Universalism and LGBTQ persons
 Christian saints sometimes identified as homosexual:
 Sergius and Bacchus (4th century martyrs)
 Aelred of Rievaulx (12th century monk)

References

Further reading

 Early Teachings on Homosexuality
 Summa Theologiae – online version
 Hildegard of Bingen, "Scivias," Columba Hart and Jane Bishop, translators; New York: Paulist Press, 1990
 The Church & the Homosexual
 John Boswell, Christianity, Social Tolerance and Homosexuality, Chicago: University of Chicago Press, 1980
 Christian Passage On St. Serge & St. Bacchus
 Claude Courouve, L'homosexualité masculine dans les textes grecs et latins de l'Antiquité et du Moyen-Âge
Johansson, Warren 'Whosoever Shall Say To His Brother, Racha.' Studies in Homosexuality, Vol XII:  Homosexuality and Religion and Philosophy. Ed. Wayne Dynes & Stephen Donaldson.  New York & London:  Garland, 1992.  pp. 212–214
Smith, Morton "Clement of Alexandria and Secret Mark:  The Score at the End of the First Decade." Studies in Homosexuality, Vol XII:  Homosexuality and Religion and Philosophy. Ed. Wayne Dynes & Stephen Donaldson.  New York & London:  Garland, 1992. pp. 295–307
Mader, Donald "The Entimos Pais of Matthew 8:5–13 and Luke 7:1–10"  Studies in Homosexuality, Vol XII:  Homosexuality and Religion and Philosophy. Ed. Wayne Dynes & Stephen Donaldson.  New York & London:  Garland, 1992. pp. 223–235.

LGBT and Christianity
LGBT history